is a Japanese professional wrestler, signed to New Japan Pro-Wrestling (NJPW) under the ring name Master Wato (マスター・ワト Masutā Wato). He was previously on an international learning excursion, working for NJPW's Mexican partner Consejo Mundial de Lucha Libre (CMLL) under the ring name Kawato-San/Kawato San. He is a former CMLL World Lightweight Champion and competed in the main event of CMLL's 2020 Sin Piedad supercard show.

He was trained in the NJPW Noge Dojo in the Tokyo Prefecture. From 2016 until 2019 he worked as a "Young Lion" in NJPW, gaining in ring experience while still training. As a "Young Lion" he mainly faced other trainees early on, moving on to participate in various tournaments such as the 2017 Super Junior Tag Tournament (with Kushida) and finishing second in the 2017 Young Lion Cup.

Professional wrestling career

New Japan Pro-Wrestling (2016–2018)
Kawato started working for New Japan Pro-Wrestling (NJPW) in 2016, training in their dojo for his in-ring career. He started by training as a "young lion" in NJPW's dojo, wearing simple black trunks and boots as he worked with other of NJPW "Young Lions" and experienced veterans as part of his training. On January 3, 2016, Kawato made his in-ring debut, losing to fellow "Young Lion" Yohei Komatsu. Throughout 2016, Kawato spent most of the year working opening and undercard matches, and primarily fought against fellow "Young Lion" Teruaki Kanemitsu. On February 9, 2016, Kawato teamed with Jyushin Thunder Liger and Yuji Nagata to defeat the team of Henare, Tomoyuki Oka and Yoshitatsu in a six-man tag team match. David Finlay, Kawato, Manabu Nakanishi, and Ryusuke Taguchi defeated TenCozy (Hiroyoshi Tenzan and Satoshi Kojima), Liger, and Oka in the opening match of the NJPW 45th Anniversary show in Korakuen Hall.

On April 22, 2016, Kawato won his first singles match when he defeated Shota Umino. Kawato and Yoshitatsu defeated Katsuya Kitamura and Oka in the dark match of the 2017 Wrestling Dontaku major show, but still did not work on the televised portion of the show. On June 20, Kawato was involved in his first higher card match when he teamed with Hiroshi Tanahashi, losing to Los Ingobernables de Japón ("The Unruly from Japan"; Tetsuya Naito and Hiromu Takahashi). In October, Kawato teamed with Kushida to take part in the 2017 Super Junior Tag Tournament where they were defeated in the first round by Roppongi 3K (Sho and Yoh). On November 5, 2017, Kawato, alongside Juice Robinson, Liger, Kushida and Tiger Mask defeated Suzuki-gun (El Desperado, Taichi, Taka Michinoku, Yoshinobu Kanemaru and Zack Sabre Jr.) at Power Struggle.

From October 12 to December 21, Kawato took part in the 2017 Young Lion Cup, where he finished second with a record of four wins (defeating Oka, Shota Umino, Ren Narita, and Tetsuhiro Yagi) and one loss, to tournament winner Katsuya Kitamura, to end up in second place overall.  Kawato competed on all eight days of the 2018 Fantastica Mania tour, where NJPW and Mexican-based Consejo Mundial de Lucha Libre (CMLL) co-promoted a number of shows in Japan. Each night, Kawato and various tag team partners faced, and lost to, members of Los Ingobernables de Japón. His final match of the tour, and for NJPW at the time, saw him team with Mexican wrestler Atlantis as they lost to Gedo and Bárbaro Cavernario.

Consejo Mundial de Lucha Libre (2018–2020)
On January 9, 2018, CMLL announced on Twitter that Kawato would begin his excursion with them at the end of the month, and would actively compete in the promotion after taking part in New Japan's Fantastica Mania events. While in CMLL he would be billed as "Kawato San" (sometimes written as "Kawato-San"). For his first CMLL match, Kawato teamed up Misterioso Jr. and Virus, losing to Audaz, Pegasso, and Rey Cometa in a six-man tag team match. While he was working for CMLL, they also allowed Kawato San to wrestle on the Mexican independent circuit between CMLL shows. His first independent circuit match was on March 11, where he lost to Ricky Marvin as part of a Lucha Memes show.

In CMLL, he was teamed up with Okumura, CMLL's Japanese liaison, to form a team called Eje del Mal ("Axis of Evil"), presenting them as a group of "evil foreigners". Their first match as a team saw the two, and Johnny Idol, lose to Guerrero Maya Jr., Rey Cometa, and Stuka Jr. Kawato San was one of twelve wrestlers competing in a torneo cibernetico elimination match to determine the challenger for CMLL's Rey del Inframundo ("King of the Underworld") championship, but was eliminated early on. He was also invited to participate in the 2018 Leyenda de Plata ("Silver Legend"), one of CMLL's most prestigious tournaments. Kawato was the first man eliminated, pinned by Audaz about eight minutes into the match.

He also participated in the 2019 Reyes del Aire ("King of the Air") tournament which took place on January 6 in Mexico City. He was the tenth man eliminated, as Audza pinned him after just over 20 minutes of wrestling. Just over a year after his CMLL debut, Kawato San appeared on his first major CMLL show as he teamed up with Disturbio and Misterioso Jr. to lose to Blue Panther Jr., Black Panther and Rey Cometa on the undercard of the 2019 Juicio Final. In June 2019, Kawato San and Audaz outlasted Eléctrico, El Hijo del Villano III, Flyer, Príncipe Diamante, Star Jr., Super Astro Jr., and Halcón Suriano Jr. to earn a match for the vacant CMLL World Super Lightweight Championship. The following week, on June 30, 2019, Kawato San defeated Audaz to become the new champion. Kawato did not wrestle any matches after July 28, 2019, due to what was later revealed to be a knee injury. It was announced on November 6, 2019, that Kawato-San had returned to Mexico after recovering from his knee injury. Kawato was stripped of the CMLL World Lightweight Championship due to the injury. Kawato returned to the ring on November 9, teaming with El Felino and Rey Bucanero as they lost to Atlantis Jr., Ángel de Oro, and Niebla Roja.

Starting in late October, Kawato San and Dulce Gardenia became involved in a storyline feud, with the two facing off in six-man tag team matches throughout November and December. Kawato and Gardenia both agreed to "bet" their hair. The lucha de apuestas match was the main event of the 2020 Sin Piedad ("No Mercy") show held on January 1, 2020. Gardenia won the match two-falls-to-one, followed by Kawato San being forced to shave all his hair off. Kawato San was one of 12 wrestlers competing in the 2020 Reyes del Aire ("Kings of the air") tournament, but was the sixth wrestler eliminated when Rey Cometa pinned him.

Return to NJPW (2020–present) 
On July 3, 2020, Kawato returned to NJPW after a two-year excursion under the name Master Wato. As he was exiting, he was attacked by Suzuki-gun member Douki. It was later announced that at the New Japan Cup Finals in Osaka-Jo Hall, Wato would face Douki in a singles match where he was victorious. He then embarked on a feud with another member of Suzuki-gun, Yoshinobu Kanemaru. The feud ended when Kanemaru pinned Wato at Summer Struggle in Jingu Stadium in August. In November 2020, he entered the Best of the Super Juniors tournament where he was scheduled for a rematch against Kanemaru, but Kanemaru pulled out injured. Wato finished the tournament with 4 wins and 5 losses, failing to advance to the finals. At Wrestle Kingdom 15, he and Ryusuke Taguchi unsuccessfully challenged Suzuki-gun tag team El Desperado & Yoshinobu Kanemaru for the IWGP Junior Heavyweight Tag Team Championship. After being pinned by Bushi in a ten-man tag team match at New Year Dash!!, the two men feuded on the Road To The New Beginning 2021 tour. At The New Beginning in Hiroshima, Bushi defeated Wato in a singles match. Wato went on to compete in the 2021 Best of The Super Juniors finishing with a 4–7 record failing to advance.

On the preshow of the second night of Wrestle Kingdom 16, Wato would defeat El Desperado in a six man tag match and earn himself a title shot at the IWGP Junior Heavyweight Championship. At NJPW New Years Golden Series on February 11 he would be unsuccessful in his attempt. Eight days later, on February 19, he and Taguchi having formed the team called Six or Nine, would win The IWGP Junior Tag Team Championships in a four-way tag, making that his first championship victory in New Japan Pro Wrestling. Despite being a Junior Heavyweight, Wato competed in the New Japan Cup, a heavyweight tournament, where he received a Bye to the second round, although here he was defeated by Kazuchika Okada. Six or Nine made their first successful tag team title defense at Hyper Battle, defeating Bullet Club's Cutest Tag Team (El Phantasmo and Taiji Ishimori). In May, they made a second successful defense against Suzuki-Gun's Yoshinobu Kanemaru and Douki. Later in the month, Wato competed in the annual Best of the Super Juniors tournament. In the B Block, Wato finished with 8 points, failing to advance to the finals. On the day of the tournament finals, Wato and Taguchi were defeated by United Empire's Francesco Akira and T.J. Perkins in a non-title match. Due to this loss, Six or Nine defended the titles in a rematch, where they lost the championships to Akira and TJP, ending their reign at 121 days. Six or Nine, failed to win the titles back in a rematch at Burning Spirit. Following this, Wato focused on singles competition leading to Wato successfully defeated reigning IWGP Junior Heavyweight Champion, Taiji Ishimori, in a non-title match on October 10 at Declaration of Power. After the match, Ishimori was confronted by Hiromu Takahashi and El Desperado, who both wanted Junior Heavyweight title shots. This led to Ishimori, declaring that he would defend his championship against Desperado, Takahashi, and Wato in a four-way match at Wrestle Kingdom 17. On January 4, 2023, Wato was unsuccessful in capturing the junior heavyweight championship, which was won by Takahashi.

Championships and accomplishments 
Consejo Mundial de Lucha Libre
CMLL World Lightweight Championship (1 time)
New Japan Pro-Wrestling
IWGP Junior Heavyweight Tag Team Championship (1 time) – with Ryusuke Taguchi
Pro Wrestling Illustrated
Ranked No. 436 of the top 500 singles wrestlers in the PWI 500 in 2022

Luchas de Apuestas record

Footnotes

References

External links 
 
 Hirai Kawato's CAGEMATCH profile

1997 births
Living people
People from Ikeda, Osaka
Japanese male professional wrestlers
IWGP Junior Heavyweight Tag Team Champions
CMLL World Lightweight Champions
21st-century professional wrestlers